Empriini is a tribe of sawflies in the family Tenthredinidae.

Genera
include;
 Ametastegia Costa 1882
 Aphilodyctium Ashmead 1898 
 Empria Lepeletier & Serville 1828
 Monsoma MacGillivray 1908
 Monostegia Costa 1859
 Phrontosoma MacGillivray 1908

References

Bibliography 

 
 , in 

Tenthredinidae
Hymenoptera tribes